Mark il poliziotto spara per primo  (internationally released as Mark Shoots First) is an Italian poliziottesco film  directed in 1975 by Stelvio Massi. It is the sequel of Mark il poliziotto.

Cast 
 Franco Gasparri: Mark Terzi 
 Lee J. Cobb: commendator Benzi 
 Massimo Girotti: vice questore Spaini 
 Ely Galleani: Angela Frizzo 
 Nino Benvenuti: Ghini 
 Andrea Aureli: giornalista 
 Spiros Focás: Morini 
 Guido Celano: Mario Borelli

Release
Mark Shoots First was released theatrically in Italy on 22 December 1975 where it was distributed by P.A.C. (Produzioni Atlas Cinematografica). The film grossed ₤1.227 billion Italian lira in Italy.

References

Footnotes

Sources

External links
 

1975 films
1970s Italian-language films
Poliziotteschi films
1970s crime action films
Italian crime action films
Films directed by Stelvio Massi
Italian sequel films
1970s Italian films